I Know You Know That I Know is a mural by Sandra Fettingis, installed at the Colorado Convention Center, in Denver, Colorado, U.S.

References

Murals in Colorado